Dormer's bat or Dormer's pipistrelle (Scotozous dormeri) is a species of vesper bat. It is the only species in its genus. It is found in Bangladesh, Bhutan, India, and Pakistan. Its natural habitats are subtropical and tropical dry forests, arable land, plantations, rural gardens, and urban areas.

The holotype for this species was from the Bellary Hills in Southern India and was collected by James Charlemagne Dormer, after whom it is named. Bat flies found on this species include: Basilia fletcheri.

References

Vesper bats
Mammals of Pakistan
Mammals of Bangladesh
Taxonomy articles created by Polbot
Bats of Asia
Taxa named by George Edward Dobson
Mammals described in 1875